Millington is a civil parish in Cheshire East, England.  It contains four buildings that are recorded in the National Heritage List for England as designated listed buildings, all of which are at Grade II.   This grade is the lowest of the three gradings given to listed buildings and is applied to "buildings of national importance and special interest".  The parish is entirely rural, and the listed buildings consist of two farmhouses, a cottage and a former chapel.

See also

 Listed buildings in Agden
 Listed buildings in High Legh
 Listed buildings in Little Bollington
 Listed buildings in Mere
 Listed buildings in Rostherne

References
Citations

Sources

 

Listed buildings in the Borough of Cheshire East
Lists of listed buildings in Cheshire